Chazabeh (Persian: چذابه) is a border terminal in Iran, located in Khuzestan province in south-western Iran. It is in the common border between Iran and Iraq, 95 km from Ahwaz, the center of Khuzestan. Chazabah can be regarded as an important border terminal that is especially an entry point in addition to the Shalamcheh border crossing for those (e.g. pilgrims) who intend to travel from Iran into Iraq (Karbala, Najaf, etc.) through Khuzestan.

Recently, Chazabeh has become a better-known border crossing due to its high activity, especially in the months Muharram and Safar when hundreds of thousands of Iranian and non-Iranian pilgrims choose this border crossing for their travel to Iraq and vice versa. For example, in just the first three weeks of the Arabic/Islamic month of Safar (about Nov 2016), more than 700.000 people used this border crossing for their travels.

Chazabeh had a significant role in the Iran–Iraq War. For instance, in the operation of Tange-Chazabeh, Saddam personally attended the area in order to recapture the city of Bostan, Iran, and the bloodiest scene of the war between Iran and Iraq happened in that area.

See also
Khosravi

References

Iran–Iraq border crossings